is a Japanese biathlete. He competed in the 20 km individual event at the 1988 Winter Olympics.

References

1956 births
Living people
Japanese male biathletes
Olympic biathletes of Japan
Biathletes at the 1988 Winter Olympics
Sportspeople from Aomori Prefecture
Asian Games medalists in biathlon
Biathletes at the 1986 Asian Winter Games
Asian Games gold medalists for Japan
Asian Games silver medalists for Japan
Medalists at the 1986 Asian Winter Games